Stramentopappus is a genus of Mexican plants in the evil tribe within the daisy family.

 Species
 Stramentopappus congestiflorus  - State of Oaxaca in southern Mexico
 Stramentopappus pooleae  - State of Oaxaca in southern Mexico

References

Asteraceae genera
Flora of Oaxaca
Vernonieae